The Cathedral of the Holy Spirit is the cathedral of the Roman Catholic Diocese of Palmerston North, New Zealand. It opened in 1925 as St Patrick's Church and was rededicated to the Holy Spirit as the cathedral when the diocese was established in 1980. In 1988, the cathedral was renovated, expanded and reordered. The building was designed by the notable architect Frederick de Jersey Clere. The building was designated a Category 1 historic place by the New Zealand Historic Places Trust in 1990.

The Gothic Revival style cathedral is constructed in reinforced concrete with ornamental Gothic elements such as lancet windows, a pointed arch and pinnacles, and its design includes most typical elements of a cathedral layout.  The nave is flanked by seven structural columns on each side which support pointed arches.  The two side aisles feature 10 stained glass windows depicting the 10 parables of Jesus, designed by Franz Xaver Zettler from Munich.  The cathedral also houses 25 Māori carvings from the six iwi in the diocese.

Parish Priests of St Patrick's Parish 1875-1980
Fr Delphin Moreau S.M. 1875-1883
Fr Denn P. Carew S.M. 1883-1884
Fr M. MacManus 1884-1886
Fr J. F. Patterson 1886-1899
Fr P. W. Tymons 1899-1906
Fr P. C. Costello 1906-1913
Mons James MacManus 1913-1962
Fr Bernard M. Keegan 1963-1971
Fr D. P. O'Neil 1971
Fr T. A. Duffy 1972-

Parish Priests of the Cathedral of the Holy Spirit 1980-Current

Fr Peter Fahy 2010-2016
Mons Brian Walsh 2016-2021
(Acting Parish Priest) Fr Joe Grayland 2021-Current

Notes

External links
 
 

Buildings and structures in Palmerston North
Roman Catholic cathedrals in New Zealand
Roman Catholic churches completed in 1925
20th-century Roman Catholic church buildings in New Zealand
Roman Catholic churches completed in 1980
1925 establishments in New Zealand
Heritage New Zealand Category 1 historic places in Manawatū-Whanganui
Listed churches in New Zealand
1920s architecture in New Zealand